Cristina Alicia Esteban Calonje (born 5 November 1976) is a Spanish politician who is a member of the 14th Congress of Deputies from the Vox party.

Cristina Esteban Calonje is an asset manager at BBVA Bank in Madrid, where she manages investment funds and pension plans. She speaks German and English. She is married to Antonio Vallejo-Nágera Deroulede, a real estate businessman, and has two children.

References

External links 

 Cristina Esteban at Twitter

Living people
1976 births
Members of the 13th Congress of Deputies (Spain)
Members of the 14th Congress of Deputies (Spain)
Vox (political party) politicians
Women members of the Congress of Deputies (Spain)